The 1995 Chatham Cup was the 68th annual nationwide knockout football competition in New Zealand.

Up to the last 16 of the competition, the cup was run in three regions (northern, central, and southern), with an open draw from the quarter-finals on. National League teams received a bye until the third round (last 64). In all, 141 teams took part in the competition, which consisted of five rounds followed by quarter-finals, semi-finals, and a final.

The 1995 final
Waitakere City completed the league/cup double.

Results

Third Round

Fourth Round

* Won on penalties by Mount Maunganui (9-8)

Fifth Round

* Won on penalties by Christchurch Rangers (5-4)

Quarter-finals

Semi-finals

Final

References

Rec.Sport.Soccer Statistics Foundation New Zealand 1995 page
UltimateNZSoccer website 1995 Chatham Cup page

Chatham Cup
Chatham Cup
Chatham Cup